Tmeticus is a genus of sheet weavers that was first described by Anton Menge in 1868.

Species
 it contains nine species, found in Europe, North America, Siberia, East Asia, and the Urals:
Tmeticus affinis (Blackwall, 1855) (type) – Europe, Russia (Europe to Far East), Mongolia, Canada
Tmeticus brevipalpus Banks, 1901 – USA
Tmeticus maximus Emerton, 1882 – USA
Tmeticus neserigonoides Saito & Ono, 2001 – Japan
Tmeticus nigerrimus Saito & Ono, 2001 – Japan
Tmeticus nigriceps (Kulczyński, 1916) – Russia (Urals to Far East)
Tmeticus ornatus (Emerton, 1914) – USA, Canada
Tmeticus tolli Kulczyński, 1908 – Russia (mainland, Sakhalin), Mongolia, China
Tmeticus vulcanicus Saito & Ono, 2001 – Korea, Japan

See also
 List of Linyphiidae species (Q–Z)

References

Araneomorphae genera
Linyphiidae
Spiders of Asia
Spiders of North America
Spiders of Russia